was a member of the Japanese imperial family and a field marshal in the Imperial Japanese Army during the Meiji and Taishō periods. He was the father of Empress Kōjun (who in turn was the consort of the Emperor Shōwa), and therefore, the maternal grandfather of Emperor Emeritus Akihito.

Biography

Early life
Prince Kuni Kuniyoshi was born in Kyoto, the third son of Prince Kuni Asahiko (Kuni-no-miya Asahiko Shinnō) and the court lady Isume Makiko. His father, Prince Asahiko (also known as Shōren-no-miya Sun'yu and Nagakawa-no-miya Asahiko), was a son of Prince Fushimi Kuniye (Fushimi-no-miya Kuniie Shinnō), the head of one of ōke branch houses of the imperial dynasty entitled to provide a successor to the throne of Japan. In 1872, Emperor Meiji granted Prince Asahiko the title "Kuni-no-miya" and authorized him to begin a new branch of the imperial family.

Prince Kuniyoshi succeeded to the title upon his father's death on 29th October 1891. His half-brothers, Prince Asaka Yasuhiko, Prince Higashikuni Naruhiko, Prince Nashimoto Morimasa, and Prince Kaya Kuninori, all formed new branches of the imperial family during the Meiji period.

Military career
Prince Kuni Kuniyoshi graduated from the 7th class of the Imperial Japanese Army Academy in 1897 as a second lieutenant, and was promoted to lieutenant in February 1899 and to captain in March 1901. Promoted to major in the infantry in November 1904, during the Russo-Japanese War he was assigned to the staff of General Kuroki Tamemoto, commander of the IJA 1st Army. For his war services he was awarded the Order of the Golden Kite (4th class). He then graduated from the Army War College and was assigned to the 3rd Regiment of the Imperial Guards Division.

From 1907 to 1910, he studied military tactics in Germany and was attached to Second Regiment of the Prussian Foot Guards. He was promoted to lieutenant colonel in April 1908 and to colonel in December 1910. Upon returning to Japan, Prince Kuni rose to the rank of major general in August 1913 and given command of the 38th Infantry Regiment. Later he commanded the Imperial Guard of Japan and rose to the rank of lieutenant general in August 1917 and commander of the IJA 15th Division. Along with that command, he received the additional post of chief priest of Meiji Shrine.

Prince Kuni became a full general and a member of the Imperial Japanese Army General Staff in August 1923. An early advocate of military aviation, one of his protégés was Yamamoto Isoroku, the future admiral and commander-in-chief of the Imperial Japanese Navy. On 27 June 1929 (two days before his death), Emperor Hirohito promoted him to the honorary rank of field marshal and granted him the Grand Cordon of the Supreme Order of the Chrysanthemum.

Prince Kuni's death occurred soon after he arrived at his villa at Atami, of an acute onset of an undisclosed disease.

Honours
He received the following orders and decorations:

Marriage and family

On 13 December 1889, Prince Kuni Kuniyoshi married Shimazu Chikako (19 October 1879 – 9 September 1956), the seventh daughter of Prince Shimazu Tadayoshi, the last daimyō of Satsuma Domain. The marriage represented an alliance between the imperial family and the Satsuma clan.

 
 
 : married Crown Prince Hirohito (the future Emperor Shōwa) in 1924.

References

1873 births
1929 deaths
Marshals of Japan
Kuni-no-miya
Japanese princes
Japanese military personnel of the Russo-Japanese War
Japanese generals
People of Meiji-period Japan
People from Kyoto
Kannushi
Recipients of the Order of the Golden Kite
Recipients of the Order of the Rising Sun with Paulownia Flowers
Grand Crosses of the Order of Saint Stephen of Hungary
Honorary Knights Grand Cross of the Royal Victorian Order
Recipients of the Order of the Netherlands Lion
Grand Croix of the Légion d'honneur